Plucky Brit is slang for a British athlete who is brave and determined, especially when success is unlikely. The term is used in popular culture. Success in the 2012 Summer Olympics challenged the stereotype of the British plucky loser. Chris Hoy stated "I think the Brits historically have got used to being the plucky losers. The attitude has been we'll support our lads and our lasses but we don't expect them to win anything. The teams go to the world cup in football and there are the usual tales of woe – losing penalty shoot-outs. It's like inevitable that the Brits are going to get beaten at some point. But I think that's there's a change in that culture in sport."

References

Neologisms
Pejorative terms for European people
Phrases
Slang
Subcultures
Athletics in the United Kingdom